The Manchurian Candidate is a 1959 political thriller novel by Richard Condon.

The Manchurian Candidate may also refer to:
The Manchurian Candidate (1962 film), starring Frank Sinatra
The Manchurian Candidate (2004 film), the remake of the 1962 version starring Denzel Washington

See also
 Manchurian (disambiguation)